RC Dnipro (RK Dnipro) is a Ukrainian rugby club in Dnipro. They currently play in the Ukrainian rugby second league.

History
The club was founded in 2009, but rugby was first played in former Dnipropetrovsk around the mid-1960s. There were various teams at different times, such as SC Atlant and RC Flanker.

External links
RC Dnipro

Rugby clubs established in 2009
Ukrainian rugby union teams
Sport in Dnipro
2009 establishments in Ukraine